Local elections was held in Caloocan on May 10, 2010 within the Philippine general election. The voters elected  the elective local posts in the city: the mayor, vice mayor, the two Congressmen, and the councilors, six in each of the city's two legislative districts.

Mayoral and vice mayoral election
Incumbent Enrico Echiverri is now on his second term as the mayor of Caloocan. As prescribed by the 1987 Constitution of the Philippines, he is still eligible to run for the same office. On the other hand, another incumbent Tito Varela is now on his last term as the vice mayor of the city.

The incumbent mayor Enrico Echiverri is running again for mayoralty office under the Liberal Party (LP) with his running mate Edgar Erice. Echiverri, was the former representative of the city's first district to Philippine Congress from 1998 before his election in 2004. Erice was a former representative of the city's second district to Philippine Congress from 2001 until 2004.

Luis "Baby" Asistio, the former representative of the city's first district to Philippine Congress from 1992 until 2001 and from 2004 until 2007 also announced his bid in mayoralty race under the Nationalist People's Coalition. Another candidate for the office of the mayor is Robert "Popoy" Cordero, is running independent.

Other candidates for the vice mayor's office were Macario "Boy" Asistio, who became mayor of the city from 1980 until 1986 then from 1988 until 1995 and former actor Rey Malonzo who became vice-mayor of the city from 1992 until 1995 then mayor from 1995 until 2004. Malonzo and Asistio were formidable rivals in the city

Congressional elections

There will be two candidates for the congressman or district representative post of each of the districts of Caloocan. The city is divided into two congressional districts: the first district and the second district.

The incumbent first district representative Oscar Malapitan is running under the Nacionalista Party. In 2004, he replaced Echiverri in the post. His opponents were Ernesto Ray Adalem, Gualberto Bacolod, broadcaster Bobby Guanzon, Jaime Regalario and three-term Vice Mayor Luis Tito Varela who is running under the Liberal Party

For the second district, the incumbent representative Mary Mitzi Cajayon is running under the Lakas-Kampi-CMD party. She was elected in 2007 replacing Luis Asistio.

Results

The winners of the congressional, mayor and vice mayor seats of Caloocan is determined with the highest number of votes received. These positions are voted separately, so there is a possibility that the winning officials came from the same or different political parties.

Mayoral election

Vice mayoral election

Philippine House of Representatives elections

1st District
Oscar Malapitan is the incumbent.

2nd District
Mitzi Cajayon is the incumbent.

City Council elections
The voters in the city are set to elect six councilors on the district where they are living, hence registered. Candidates are voted separately so there are chances where winning candidates will have unequal number of votes and may come from different political parties.

Summary

1st District

|-bgcolor=black
|colspan=5|

2nd District

|-bgcolor=black
|colspan=5|

Elections in Caloocan
2010 Philippine local elections
2010 elections in Metro Manila